Donald D. Manno (May 4, 1915 – March 11, 1995) was a Major League Baseball player. He played two seasons with the Boston Bees / Braves from 1940 to 1941.

References

External links

Boston Braves players
Boston Bees players
Major League Baseball outfielders
Major League Baseball third basemen
1915 births
1995 deaths
Baseball players from Pennsylvania
Sportspeople from Williamsport, Pennsylvania
Akron Yankees players
Norfolk Tars players
Augusta Tigers players
Binghamton Triplets players
Hartford Bees players
Evansville Bees players
Welch Miners players
Hartford Chiefs players
Albany Senators players
Dallas Rebels players
Seattle Rainiers players
Waycross Bears players
Tifton Blue Sox players
Williamsport Tigers players
West Chester Golden Rams baseball players